Attorney General Pollard

John Garland Pollard (1871–1937), Attorney General of Virginia
Claude Pollard (1874–1942), Attorney General of Texas